Francesco Turrisi is a Grammy Award-winning multi instrumentalist and composer . His album They’re Calling Me Home with Rhiannon Giddens won the Grammy Award for Best Folk Album category.

References

External links

Living people
Year of birth missing (living people)
Grammy Award winners
Place of birth missing (living people)